Tom nan Gamhna is a mountain within the Ardgoil Peninsula and Arrochar Alps near Lochgoilhead in Argyll, Scottish Highlands. The mountain reaches a height of 389 m.

References
 http://streetmap.co.uk/place/Tom_nan_Gamhna_in_Argyll_and_Bute_332611_811611.htm

Mountains and hills of Argyll and Bute